Vijayawada revenue division (or Vijayawada division) is an administrative division in the NTR district of the Indian state of Andhra Pradesh. It is one of the 3 revenue divisions in the district with 8 mandals under its administration. Vijayawada serves as the headquarters of the division. The division has 1 municipality and 1 municipal corporation.

Administration 
The division is headed by a Revenue Divisional Officer(RDO). The mandals in the division are Ibrahimpatnam, Vijayawada Rural, Bhavani Puram (Vijayawada West), Gandhinagar (Vijayawada Central), Ajith Singh Nagar (Vijayawada North), Patamata(Vijayawada East), G. Konduru, Mylavaram.

The division used to be a part of Krishna district until it was reorganised to form NTR district on 4 April 2022.

See also 
List of mandals in Andhra Pradesh

References 

Revenue divisions in NTR district